Eden Grinshpan is a Canadian chef and television host based in Toronto, Ontario. She has hosted Top Chef Canada since 2017.

Early life and education
Grinshpan was born and raised in Toronto, Ontario, Canada. She spent summers in Israel as a child. Grinshpan graduated from the Metropolitan Preparatory Academy in 2004. Grinshpan studied culinary arts at Le Cordon Blue in London, graduating in 2006.

Career
Grinshpan co-created and hosted the television shows Eden Eats and Log On and Eat With Eden. Log On and Eat With Eden, which debuted on the Cooking Channel in 2013, features restaurants discovered by Grinshpan via food blogs and social media posts. Grinspahn launched the Middle-eastern inspired restaurant Dez in 2018 with Samantha Wasser. The Nolita-based restaurant closed in 2019.

Grinshpan has been the host of Top Chef Canada since 2017. Her first cookbook Eating Out Loud was published in 2020.

Personal life
Grinshpan lives in Toronto, Ontario with her husband, Ido Nivron, and their two daughters.

Publications

References

Alumni of Le Cordon Bleu
Canadian television chefs
Living people
Canadian television hosts
Chefs from Toronto
Year of birth missing (living people)